The Rolladen-Schneider LS2 is a 15-metre span single seat glider prototype with trailing-edge flaps, designed and built by Rolladen-Schneider Flugzeugbau GmbH c. 1973.

The LS2 was designed by Wolf Lemke and Walter Schneider in response to changes in the Standard Class rules. Only one example, an experimental prototype, was built.

First flown in 1973, it won the German Championships that year. Helmut Reichmann competing in the LS2 won the 14th World championships in Waikerie, South Australia in 1974.

Design
The design was nevertheless unsatisfactory. The flaps occupied most of the trailing edge of the wing, being intended both as a means to control speed and improve climb rates in narrow thermals. Class rules did not allow these surfaces to be coupled to the ailerons. The resultant sluggish roll rate from the very short ailerons led to poor and unsafe flying characteristics. Thrice World Champion Helmut Reichmann reportedly said the performance advantages were not worth the extra pilot workload.

The LS2 highlighted inconsistencies in the rules that promoted unwise design trends, with trade-offs having to be made by designers between competitiveness and safety. Many observers also felt that trailing-edge flaps were against the spirit of the Standard Class, an issue that affected other types such as the PIK-20, Libelle and Schreder HP-8.

The International Gliding Commission voted a new set of rules in 1974, prohibiting any lift-enhancing devices in the Standard Class and creating the 15 metre Class where these were allowed without any restriction.

Specifications

See also

References

LS-Flugzeugbau website
Simons M, Segelflugzeuge 1965-2000, Equip, 2004
Sailplane Directory

Rolladen-Schneider aircraft
1970s German sailplanes
Aircraft first flown in 1973
T-tail aircraft
Shoulder-wing aircraft